Truls Carl Eric Möregårdh (born 16 February 2002) is a Swedish table tennis player. He won bronze with the Swedish team at the World Team Table Tennis Championships in 2018, as well as at the 2019 European Table Tennis Championships. In 2021, he won silver at the 2021 World Table Tennis Championships. He is right-handed and uses the European shakehand style to hold his racquet.

Career 
The Swede was considered a great talent from an early age. He achieved his first international successes in 2016. Overall, he is two-time European student champion and one European youth champion.

He finished second in 2016, 2017 and 2018. He also won the youth TOP 10 in 2016. In 2017 and 2018 he was junior vice world champion and was allowed to take part in the 2018 Summer Youth Olympic Games in Buenos Aires, where he was able to reach the quarter-finals in an individual competition. With the Serbian Sabina Šurjan, he reached the game for the bronze medal in the mixed competition, where they were subject to the representation of Taiwan, Su Pei-ling and Lin Yun-ju. While Šurjan won her singles against Su, Möregårdh Lin and Šurjan lost in doubles.

With the team he reached 4th place. From 2018 he took part in adult tournaments with increasing frequency, notable successes being winning the bronze medal at the 2018 World Cup and the 2019 European Table Tennis Championships. In 2019 he became Swedish champion after beating Kristian Karlsson in the final. In the same year he moved from Eslövs to the Japanese club TT Saitama. In 2021 he became Swedish champion again when he defeated Anton Källberg in the final.

Overview of titles and successes

Singles
 Europe Top-16 runner-up (2022) 
 World Championship runner-up (2021)
 Two-time youth vice world champion (2017, 2019)
 European Youth Champion (2019), Silver (2018)
 Two-time vice European champion (2016, 2017)
 Winner of the youth TOP 10 (2016)
 Swedish Champion (2019, 2021)

Doubles
 European Schoolchildren (2017)
 Vice-Schoolchildren European Champion (2016), Vice-Youth European Champion (2019)

Mixed doubles
 Bronze at the European Youth Championships (2019)
 4th place at the 2018 Youth Olympic Games

Team
 3rd place at the World Championship (2018)
 3rd place at the European Championship (2019)
 Vice European Schoolchildren (2016)

Personal life
Truls Möregårdh has a brother named Malte Möregårdh.

References

External links

Truls Möregårdh at Table Tennis Media

Living people
2002 births
Swedish table tennis players
People from Lessebo Municipality
Sportspeople from Kronoberg County
Table tennis players at the 2018 Summer Youth Olympics
World Table Tennis Championships medalists